Pastels is an album by bassist Ron Carter recorded at Fantasy Studios in California in 1976 and released on the Milestone label.

Reception
The Allmusic review by Ron Wynn awarded the album 2½ stars saying "Some tremendous playing... though the strings get intrusive".

Track listing
All compositions by Ron Carter
 "Woolaphant" - 7:58  
 "Ballad" - 8:45  
 "One Bass Rag" - 7:28  
 "Pastels" - 6:21  
 "12 + 12" - 6:36

Personnel
Ron Carter - bass, piccolo bass, arranger
Kenny Barron - piano (tracks 1 & 3-5)
Hugh McCracken - electric guitar, acoustic guitar, harmonica (tracks 1 & 3-5) 
Harvey Mason - drums (tracks 1 & 3-5)
Sanford Allen - concertmaster
Virginia Baker, Myra Bucky, Fei-Pang Ching, Ronald Erickson, Daniel Kobialka, Roy Oakley Jr., Nathan Rubin, Emily Van Valkenburgh, Mark Volkert - violin
Arthur Bauch, Denis DeCoteau, Daniel Yale - viola
Garfield Moore, Kermit Moore, Melinda Ross - cello
Don Sebesky - conductor, arranger

References

1976 albums
Milestone Records albums
Albums conducted by Don Sebesky
Albums arranged by Don Sebesky
Ron Carter albums